Paul Clark may refer to:
 Paul Clark (composer) (born 1968), British composer
 Paul Clark (designer) (born 1940), British designer
 Paul Clark (educator) (born 1954), American labor historian and educator
 Paul Clark (keyboardist) (born 1962), British keyboardist and electronic musician
 Paul Clark (poker player) (1947–2015), professional poker player
 Paul Clark (politician) (born 1957), politician in the United Kingdom
 Paul Clark (Christian musician), Christian musician
 Paul Clark (footballer) (born 1958), English association football player
 Paul Clark (presenter) (born 1953), Northern Irish television presenter and journalist
 Paul Clark (judge) (1940–2008), circuit judge in the United Kingdom
 Paul Clark (athlete) (born 1950s), Canadian Paralympic athlete
 Paul F. Clark (1861–1932), politician in the state of Nebraska
 Paul Franklin Clark (1882–1983), American microbiologist
 Paul Leaman Clark, World War 2 beachmaster who had a Sentinel-class cutter named in his honor
 , the sixth Sentinel class cutter, homeported in Miami, Florida

See also
 Paul Clarke (disambiguation)

Clark, Paul